Fabien Sanconnie (born 21 February 1995) is a French rugby union player, who plays for French Top 14 side, Brive.

International career
Sanconnie was part of the French squad for the 2017 Six Nations Championship.

References

External links
France profile at FFR
Brive profile
ESPN Profile

1995 births
Living people
French rugby union players
CA Brive players
Racing 92 players
France international rugby union players
Rugby union flankers
Sportspeople from Corrèze